Small sausage in large sausage is a snack sausage sandwich invented in Taiwan in the late 20th century.  A segment of Taiwanese pork sausage is wrapped in a (slightly bigger and fatter) sticky rice sausage to make this delicacy, usually served chargrilled. Deluxe versions are available in night markets in Taiwan, with condiments such as pickled bokchoy, pickled cucumber, garlic, hot peppers, wasabi, and thick soy sauce paste to complement the taste.

See also
 Taiwanese cuisine
 Night markets in Taiwan
 List of sausages
 List of sausage dishes
 List of stuffed dishes

References

 
 
 
 

Taiwanese sausages
Stuffed dishes